Amsterdam Trade Bank (ATB) was a commercial bank registered in The Netherlands between 1994 and 2022. The bank focused on providing trade financing for companies wishing to do business in former Soviet states. 

ATB was supervised by De Nederlandsche Bank.

History
The company was founded in 1994 through Alexander Smolensky as Stolichny Bank International, a subsidiary of the Russian SBS-AGRO Bank to provide trade financing for companies wishing to do business in former Soviet Union. In addition to the Netherlands branch, Stolichny Bank International had other international branches in Kazakhstan and Macedonia. Following the 1998 Russian financial crisis, SBS-AGRO, which was Russia's largest private bank, went through restructuring.

In 2001 it became a subsidiary of Russian private investment consortium Alfa Group through ABH Holdings S.A. a limited liability company (Luxembourg) and its subsidiary ABH Financial Limited which partially controls Alfa-Bank's assets. Ukrainian-born Russian businessman Mikhail Fridman later stated that through Alfa-Bank he indirectly owned a minority stake in ATB. 

Amsterdam Trade Bank N.V. opened an internet branch in the Netherlands, Germany and Austria in 2003, 2006 and 2011, respectively. 

On April 22, 2022, the Amsterdam District Court declared the bankruptcy of Amsterdam Trade Bank N.V.

Controversies
In 2004 and again in 2007, an ATB account of the offshore company Sevenkey Limited, which is owned by Olga Shuvalova (wife of Igor Shuvalov) and supported by the Alexander Mamut-founded ALM Consulting law firm, was used to transfer large amounts in US dollars to Gallagher Holdings Limited, which is associated with Alisher Usmanov, and a bank account of the company Unicast Technologies Corporation, which is associated with Eugene Shvidler. Usmanov used the money from the 2004 transactions to purchase his stake in the Anglo-Dutch steel firm Corus Group.

In 2017 the international investigative journalist collaboration claimed ATB was involved in an infamous money laundering scheme, something the bank denied. Allegedly, $34.5 million moved through Amsterdam Trade Bank accounts.  Paul Radu led the investigations, and ATB offices were searched by the Dutch financial crimes prosecutor. The search did not result in proof of money laundering, although the bank had nonetheless placed a heavier emphasis on its compliance department following the events.

Corporate governance
Acting directors of ATB in 2018 were:

 Harris Antoniou (CEO)
 Eric Steeghs (CFO)
 Peter Ullmann (CRO)
There were also a number of non-acting directors in Supervisory Board.

Notes

References

External links
Amsterdam Trade Bank NV retail internet website
Amsterdam Trade Bank (Germany) retail internet website
Amsterdam Trade Bank (Austria) retail internet website

Defunct banks of the Netherlands
Banks based in Amsterdam
Banks established in 1994
Banks disestablished in 2022
Dutch companies established in 1994
Dutch companies disestablished in 2022